Chess Assistant is a commercial database program produced by Convekta, Ltd. The company started in Russia, but also has offices in England and the United States. The software is a management tool for organising chess information (databases of millions of games), opening training, game analysis, playing against the computer, and viewing electronic texts. It is the major commercial competitor to ChessBase. The first version of Chess Assistant was released in 1990. The current version 16, released in 2015, includes a database of 6.2 million games and 40 million computer-generated evaluations of opening moves. The program uses Houdini 4 as an analysis tool.

See also
 ChessBase
 Chess engines
 Chess Informant
 Shane's Chess Information Database

External links
  — product review by Jovan Petronic

Chess databases
Chess software